Agonum viduum is a species of ground beetle in the Platyninae subfamily. It is found in all Eastern European countries, except for Andorra, Monaco, San Marino, Vatican City and various European islands. It can also be found in Kazakhstan, of Central Asia.

References

Beetles described in 1796
viduum
Beetles of Asia
Beetles of Europe